The 2022 Cazoo European Championship was the fifteenth edition of the Professional Darts Corporation's European Championship tournament, which saw the top players from the thirteen European tour events compete against each other. The tournament took place from 27–30 October 2022 at the Westfalenhallen in Dortmund, Germany.

Rob Cross was the defending champion, having won the tournament for the second time with an 11–8 win over Michael van Gerwen in the 2021 final. However, he became the fourth consecutive defending champion to be eliminated in the first round after losing 6–5 to James Wade.

Ross Smith won his first major title, defeating Michael Smith 11–8 in the final.

Prize money
The 2022 European Championship had a total prize fund of £500,000, the same as its previous edition.

The following is the breakdown of the fund:

Qualification
The 2022 tournament continued the established qualification system whereby the top 32 players from the European Tour Order of Merit qualified for the tournament. The Order of Merit is solely based on prize money won in the thirteen European tour events during the season.

As with the previous editions, players were drawn in a fixed bracket by their seeded order with the top qualifier playing the 32nd, the second playing the 31st and so on.

The following players qualified for the tournament:

Draw

References

2022
2022 in darts
2022 in German sport
October 2022 sports events in Germany